Kudathini  is a village in the southern state of Karnataka, India. It is located in the Bellary taluk of Bellary district in Karnataka and it is a sub urban area of Bellary city.

Demographics
As of 2001 India census, Kudathini had a population of 12247 with 6333 males and 5914 females.

See also
 Bellary
 Districts of Karnataka

References

External links
 http://Bellary.nic.in/

Villages in Bellary district